The Zero Gradient Synchrotron (ZGS), was a weak focusing 12.5 GeV proton accelerator that operated at the Argonne National Laboratory in Illinois from 1964 to 1979.

It enabled pioneering experiments in particle physics, in the areas of 
 quark model tests; 
neutrino physics  (observation of neutrino interaction in its 12 ft hydrogen bubble chamber for the first time in 1970); 
spin physics of hadrons (utilizing a polarized accelerated proton beam in the GeV range for the first time); and 
Kaon decays.

Other noteworthy features of the ZGS program were the large number of university-based users and the pioneering development of  large superconducting magnets for bubble chambers and beam transport.

The hardware and building of the ZGS were ultimately inherited by a spallation neutron source program, the Intense Pulsed Neutron Source (IPNS).

In media
Significant portions of the 1996 chase film Chain Reaction were shot in the Zero Gradient Synchrotron ring room and the former Continuous Wave Deuterium Demonstrator laboratory.

References

Symposium on the 30th Anniversary of the ZGS Startup, Malcolm Derrick (ed), ANL-HEP-CP-96-12, 1994.
 History of the ZGS, J. Day et al. (eds), AIP Conference Proceedings 60, AIP, New York, 1980,     .

Particle physics facilities
Argonne National Laboratory